Tecmerium rosmarinella is a moth in the family Blastobasidae. It is found in France.

The larvae feed on Rosmarinus officinalis.

References

Moths described in 1901
Blastobasidae
Moths of Europe